The Marriages of Mademoiselle Levy (French: Les mariages de Mademoiselle Lévy) is a 1936 French comedy film directed by André Hugon and starring Yvette Lebon, Charles Lamy and Pierre Mingand. It is the fourth and final entry in a series of films beginning with Levy and Company in 1930.

The film's sets were designed by the art director Robert-Jules Garnier.

Cast
 Yvette Lebon as Minna Lévy 
 Charles Lamy  as Salomon 
 Pierre Mingand  as Pierre 
 André Burgère  as Gaston Berheim 
 Délia Col  as Françoise 
 Jean Wall as Serge Wolff 
 Armand Lurville as Jacob 
 Jules Moy  as Isaac Cohen 
 Léon Belières as Moïse 
 Gaston Séverin as Le comte de Rochemaille

References

Bibliography 
 Philippe Rège. Encyclopedia of French Film Directors, Volume 1. Scarecrow Press, 2009.

External links 
 

1936 films
French comedy films
1936 comedy films
1930s French-language films
Films directed by André Hugon
1930s French films